Aswamedham  is a 1992 Telugu-language action film directed by K. Raghavendra Rao. It stars Nandamuri Balakrishna, Shobhan Babu, Meena, Nagma and music composed by Ilaiyaraaja. It was produced by C. Aswani Dutt under the Vyjayanthi Movies banner. The film was not commercially successful.

The film was dubbed into Hindi as Akhiri Intaqam and into Tamil as Dharma Bhoomi.

Plot
The film begins with SP Abhimanyu lion-hearted cop capturing a satanic terrorist Vyaghra. Accordingly, the entire police department is bedazzled with pride and honors his staunch. Abhimanyu builds a jaunty world with his pregnant wife Lakshmi and gallant brother Kiriti. After a while, Vyaghra absconds with the aid of his acolytes Rayudu and Avinash. Sowjanya an investigative journalist is behind these treacherous to bring their rackets to light. In that operation, she is often acquainted with Kiriti in contretemps and extricated by him, when they fall in love. 

However, Kiriti & Sowjanya get ahead in providing all the pieces of evidence against Vyaghra to Abhimanyu for which he abducts Lakshmi. Abhimanyu & Kiriti backfire on him and shield Lakshmi Vyaghra is slain by Abhimanyu. Here as a startle, Vyaghra returns proclaiming as Sunil Vyaghra the twin brother of deceased Anil Vyaghra. Thus far, they manage to portray themselves as one and deceived the world. Now, Vyaghra-II explodes with vengeance and pledges to destroy Abhimanyu & Kiriti. Forthwith, he victimizes Abhimanyu as a traitor before the department by backstabbing his friend DSP Giri when he receives severe ignominy. Kiriti toils to acquit him but in vain and benumbed Abhimanyu kills himself. In tandem, he is blessed with a baby boy. 

Hence, Kiriti ignites Vyaghra when they hard-hit him. Dr. Bharati the childhood friend of Kiriti saves him. Indeed, she too loves Kiriti but backs out cognizant of his love interest in Sowjanya. Then, Vyaghra makes a huge conspiracy to destroy the country at one goes in all states. Moreover, aware of Kiriti’s survival he plots by injecting him with a slow-killing poison within 24 hours and affirms his cabal. Despite a turbulent situation, Kiriti pulls up his vigor and starts his mission of spree killing. Bharati accompanies him to boost his strength and recover him. At last, Kiriti ceases Vyaghra and Bharati rescues him. Finally, the movie ends with Kiriti making the nation pay homage to Abhimanyu.

Cast
Nandamuri Balakrishna as Kireeti
Sobhan Babu as Abhimanyu IPS
Meena as Dr. Bharathi
Nagma as Sowjanya
Amrish Puri as Anil Vyaghra & Sunil Vyaghra (Dual role)
Kota Srinivasa Rao as Rayudu
Allu Ramalingaiah as Tataji
Brahmanandam as Sivanandam
Babu Mohan as Kannayah
Radha Ravi as Avinash	
Prasad Babu as Inspector Giri
Geeta as Lakshmi

Soundtrack

Music composed by Ilaiyaraaja.  Lyrics written by Veturi. Music released on Surya Music Company.

References

External links

1992 films
Films shot in Rajasthan
Films directed by K. Raghavendra Rao
Films scored by Ilaiyaraaja
1990s Telugu-language films